Anhui Polytechnic University (AHPU) is a comprehensive public university based in Wuhu prefecture level city, Anhui province, China. The university provides programmes in the fields of science and technology, engineering, management and economics.

History 
The university was founded 1935 as the Spanish Catholic private vocational school. It later became the Wuhu Electrical Machinery School. In 1972, it came under the jurisdiction of the Chinese Ministry of Industry and it was renamed to Wuhu Mechanical School. In 1977, it became the Hefei Industrial University and began offering full-time undergraduate programmes. In 1978 the state council accredited the university to grant full-time undergraduate tertiary education programmes and it changed its name to Anhui Mechanical University. In 2001, the university was renamed as Anhui University of Technology and Science.

References

External links
 Anhui Polytechnic University Official Website 

Universities and colleges in Anhui
Educational institutions established in 1977
Educational institutions established in 1935
1935 establishments in China